"Common Law Wife"  is a song written by George Clinton
and performed by the funk band Parliament. Recorded in 1972, it was released as a bonus track on the 2003 reissue of the album Chocolate City. The song's lyrics discuss a relationship recognised by the state but not officiated by a religious order.

The context of the album is discussion of life and politics in Washington D.C., United States.

"Common Law Wife" was also recorded by a female artist named Flo. Her version is featured on the George Clinton Family Series CD Plush Funk, which was released in 1992.

References

Parliament (band) songs
1972 songs
Songs written by George Clinton (funk musician)